Evan Cody (born 10 November 1995) is an Irish hurler who plays for club side Dicksboro and at inter-county level with the Kilkenny senior hurling team. He usually lines out as a defender.

Career

Cody first played at juvenile and underage levels with the Dicksboro club. As a schoolboy with CBS Kilkenny, he won consecutive Leinster Colleges Championships. At club level he won a Kilkenny SHC title in 2017. Cody first appeared on the inter-county scene as a member of the Kilkenny minor hurling team in 2013 before later joining the under-21 side. He joined the Kilkenny senior hurling team in 2016 for the pre-season Walsh Cup, however, after being released from the panel later that season he won an All-Ireland title with the Kilkenny intermediate team. Cody spent the following few seasons on and off the senior team.

Honours

CBS Kilkenny
Leinster Colleges Senior Hurling Championship: 2013, 2014

Dicksboro
Kilkenny Senior Hurling Championship: 2017

Kilkenny
All-Ireland Intermediate Hurling Championship: 2016
Leinster Intermediate Hurling Championship: 2016
Leinster Minor Hurling Championship: 2013

References

1995 births
Living people
Dicksboro hurlers
Kilkenny inter-county hurlers